State Route 21 (SR 21) is a two lane highway that runs from the Mississippi River west of Tiptonville, Tennessee to the Kentucky state line north of Union City. This road provides access to Reelfoot Lake State Park.

Route description

SR 21 begins as a secondary highway in rural Obion County at the Kentucky state line, at the intersection of KY 116 and KY 239. It then travels south to an intersection with US 51/SR 3/SR 22 just north of Union City. It then enters Union City on N Clover Street, then turns west on E Cheatam Street, then south again on N Division Street to intersect SR 5 (E Main Street) in Downtown. It then travels concurrently with SR 5 (now along S 1st Street) to intersect US 45W/SR 184/SR 431 in southern Union City. It then travels south along US 45W/SR 5, leaving Union City and intersecting SR 216 along the way. It then separates from US 45W/SR 5 near Rives, and turns west. In Troy, It intersects with US 51/SR 3 again, running concurrently for a short ways before separating and turning west again into downtown Troy. Once in town, it then intersects with SR 184 (old US 51) in the heart of Troy. It then leaves Troy, still going west, and enters Hornbeak and has an intersection with SR 183. It continues west to just south of Samburg, to intersect and run concurrently with SR 22, where it becomes a primary highway. SR 21/SR 22 then run along the shores of Reelfoot Lake and cross the Hill-Talley Bridge over the Obion River and enter Lake County.

The highway passes by Reelfoot Lake State Park before turning west again to enter Tiptonville and they soon come to an intersection with SR 78, where SR 22 separates and follows SR 78 north while SR 21 downgrades to secondary here. It then continues into downtown to come to an intersection between Church Street and Cedar Street, where SR 22 previously separated and turned north along Cedar Street, while SR 21 continues west on Church Street to the banks of the Mississippi River, where SR 21 ends and the road continues as Tiptonville Ferry Road along the Tennessee-Obion Levee.

Major intersections

See also

References

External links

021
Transportation in Obion County, Tennessee
Transportation in Lake County, Tennessee